Riccardo Nowak (16 January 1885 – 18 February 1950) was an Italian épée, foil and sabre fencer who took part in the 1908 Olympic Games in London.

Biography
Nowak won an Olympic silver medal in fencing at the 1908 Summer Olympics in London. He was part of the Italian team that finished second in the sabre behind Hungary. The others in the team were Marcello Bertinetti, Sante Ceccherini, Alessandro Pirzio Biroli and Abelardo Olivier.

References

External links
 

1885 births
1950 deaths
Italian male épée fencers
Fencers at the 1908 Summer Olympics
Olympic fencers of Italy
Sportspeople from Bergamo
Olympic silver medalists for Italy
Olympic medalists in fencing
Medalists at the 1908 Summer Olympics
Italian male foil fencers
Italian male sabre fencers